Luke Meyer is an American documentary filmmaker who has made the films Darkon (2006), New World Order (2009) and others. He is a founding partner of the New York-based filmmaking collective SeeThink Films.

Career 

Meyer's first film, Darkon (2006), was a documentary about a live action role playing group. The film was acquired by IFCtv after playing in a limited theatrical release. IFCtv later produced his second film, New World Order (2009), a documentary about conspiracy theorists.

Meyer has worked as an editor, writer, and producer on the films Alice Neel (2007), The Feature (2008) and King Kelly (2012).

Meyer is a part of SeeThink Films, which he formed with Tom Davis, Andrew Neel and Ethan Palmer.

He originally majored in writing and got into filmmaking as an extension of his interest in storytelling.

Filmography

Awards 
Darkon won the Audience Award at the South by Southwest Film Festival in 2006.

Breaking A Monster won 'Best Documentary' at the 2016 UK Video Music Awards.

References

Further reading
 https://www.talkhouse.com/capturing-reality-unlocking-truth-documentary/
 http://www.hollywoodreporter.com/news/brooklyn-teenage-heavy-metal-band-721231?mobile_redirect=false
 http://www.austinchronicle.com/screens/2007-01-26/439264/
 http://www.indiewire.com/article/luke_meyer_and_andrew_neel_on_their_new_world_order
 http://www.thedocumentaryblog.com/index.php/2013/06/19/documentary-short-luke-meyers-unlocking-the-truth/

External links 
 
 SeeThink Films website

American film directors
Living people
American film producers
American cinematographers
American film editors
American screenwriters
Year of birth missing (living people)